Vieux is a commune in the Calvados department in the Normandy region in northwestern France.

History
The town contains numerous Roman era ruins, as Vieux was a settlement called Aregenua, and appears on the Roman map, Tabula Peutingeriana.

During the Battle of Normandy in 1944, Vieux was designated as Hill 112 position, a strategic point for the Battle of Caen, the area of rue d'Esquay and the Bas de Vieux were badly affected by the allied bombardment of July 6, 1944. The portion of these streets, destroyed at this time are now dated for its name.

Sights
The archaeological museum of Vieux-la-Romaine (as Aregenua, Vieux was capital of the Viducasses tribe).
Roman villa of Bas de Vieux

Population

See also
Communes of the Calvados department

References

External links

Site of the archaeological museum of Vieux-la-Romaine

Communes of Calvados (department)
Viducasses
Calvados communes articles needing translation from French Wikipedia